James Murdoch (28 December 1886 – 27 October 1935) was an Australian politician.

He was born in Cambridge, Tasmania, the son of James Murdoch, who was also a Tasmanian politician. In 1925 he succeeded his father as the independent member for Pembroke in the Tasmanian Legislative Council. He held the seat until his death in 1935, whereupon he was succeeded by his elder brother John.

References

1886 births
1935 deaths
Independent members of the Parliament of Tasmania
Members of the Tasmanian Legislative Council
20th-century Australian politicians